Tahuneh-ye Qazi (also Romanized as Ţāḥūneh-ye Qāz̤ī; also known as Asīyāb-e Qāz̤ī (Persian: اسياب قاضي) and Asīyābqāz̤ī) is a village in Fathabad Rural District, in the Central District of Baft County, Kerman Province, Iran. At the 2006 census, its population was 134, in 34 families.

References 

Populated places in Baft County